Reza Alipour Shenazandifard (born 29 َApril 1994) is an Iranian speed climber from Qazvin.
He is nicknamed the "Persian Cheetah".

In 2013 at the World Cup in Haiyang, China, he broke the world record and registered 06.24 seconds to win the first gold medal in speed climbing in Iranian history.

Then in 2014 in Spain, he registered 05.97 seconds and broke his own Iranian record in speed climbing.
The International Federation of Sport Climbing IFSC titled him an Asiatic cheetah.
Upon setting the new world record of 5.48 seconds at the IFSC World Cup Nanjing, he was named the Usain Bolt of speed climbing.

On April 30, 2017, in Nanjing, China, Alipour set a new world record; scaling a 15-meter wall in 5.48 seconds, snatching the gold medal, and shattering the previous record of 5.60 seconds held by Ukraine's Danyil Boldyrev.

He has been crowned the 2017 International World Games Association (IWGA) Athlete of the Year. Alipour received 90,790 votes in the contest with second place going to Ukrainian powerlifter Larysa Soloviova, who scored 90,036.

He also finished in first place at the 18th Asian Games in Palembang in Men's Speed Climbing competition, Zhong Qixin from China won the silver medal and bronze medal went to Indonesian climber Aspar Jaelolo. Iranian speed climber Reza Alipour seats top at the latest 2018 World Ranking published by International Federation of Sport Climbing IFSC and collecting 324.68 points and Bassa Mawem of France and Dmitrii Timofeev of Russia stand next with 318.59 and 316.01 points respectively

His cousin, Mehdi, also competes as a speed climber.

World Cup podiums

References

External links 
 
 
 

1994 births
Living people
World Games gold medalists
Competitors at the 2017 World Games
Asian Games medalists in sport climbing
Asian Games gold medalists for Iran
Sport climbers at the 2018 Asian Games
Medalists at the 2018 Asian Games
People from Qazvin
21st-century Iranian people
Iranian rock climbers
IFSC Climbing World Championships medalists
IFSC Climbing World Cup overall medalists
Speed climbers